Mikhail "Misha" Arkadyevich Shifman (born 4 April 1949) is a theoretical physicist (high energy physics), formerly at Institute for Theoretical and Experimental Physics, Moscow,  Ida Cohen Fine Professor of Theoretical Physics, William I. Fine Theoretical Physics Institute, University of Minnesota.

Scientific contributions
Shifman is known for a number of basic contributions to quantum chromodynamics, the theory of strong interactions, and to understanding of supersymmetric gauge dynamics. The most important results due to M. Shifman are diverse and include (i) the discovery of the penguin mechanism in the flavor-changing weak decays (1974); (ii) introduction of the gluon condensate and development of the SVZ sum rules relating properties of the low-lying hadronic states to the vacuum condensates (1979); (iii) introduction of the invisible axion (1980) (iv) first exact results in supersymmetric Yang–Mills theories (NSVZ beta function, gluino condensate,1983–1988); (v) heavy quark theory based on the operator product expansion (1985–1995); (vi) critical domain walls (D-brane analogs) in super-Yang-Mills (1996); (vii) non-perturbative (exact) planar equivalence between super-Yang–Mills and orientifold non-supersymmetric theories (2003); (viii) non-Abelian flux tubes and confined monopoles (2004 till present). His paper with A. Vainshtein and Zakharov on the SVZ sum rules is among the all-time top cited papers in high-energy physics.

Honors and awards
Mikhail Shifman received the Alexander-von-Humboldt Award in 1993, the Sakurai Prize in 1999, the Ida Cohen Fine Chair in Theoretical Physics and the Julius Edgar Lilienfeld Prize in 2006; he is the 2007 laureate of the Blaise Pascal Chair, 2013 Pomeranchuk Prize and he was awarded the 2016 Dirac Medal and Prize. In May 2018, M. Shifman was elected to the US National Academy of Sciences. 2022: Fulbright Distinguished Scholar. He is also a Fellow of the American Physical Society.

Political positions 
In February-March 2022, he signed two open letters by Russian scientists condemning the 2022 Russian invasion of Ukraine.

Selected books

See also
KSVZ axion (Kim–Shifman–Vainshtein–Zakharov axion model)
SVZ sum rules (Shifman–Vainshtein–Zakharov sum rules)
Penguin mechanism
QCD vacuum
NSVZ beta function
Gluon condensation
Gluino condensation
Critical (BPS saturated) domain walls in super-Yang–Mills
Non-Abelian flux tubes in super-Yang–Mills
Planar equivalence in non-Abelian orientifold theories

References

External links
1999 Sakurai Prize citation
2006 Lilienfeld Prize citation
2007 Chaires Blaise Pascal
Shifman homepage at the University of Minnesota
BIO at the University of Minnesota
FTPI homepage at the University of Minnesota
2016 Dirac Medal citation

1949 births
Living people
21st-century American physicists
20th-century American Jews
Fellows of the American Physical Society
Russian physicists
Moscow Institute of Physics and Technology alumni
Institute for Theoretical and Experimental Physics alumni
Russian activists against the 2022 Russian invasion of Ukraine
University of Minnesota faculty
Scientists from Riga
Theoretical physicists
J. J. Sakurai Prize for Theoretical Particle Physics recipients
Members of the United States National Academy of Sciences
21st-century American Jews